Tathali is a City and municipality in Bhaktapur District in the Bagmati Zone of central Nepal. At the time of the 1991 Nepal census it had a population of 4,520 with 751 houses in it.

References

Populated places in Bhaktapur District